Oak Grove is an unincorporated community in northern Surry County, North Carolina, United  States, located near Bottom.

Geography
It is located between the Wood Fork Branch and the Little Fisher River .  Roughly centered on the intersection of Oak Grove Church Road and West Pine Street (North Carolina Highway 89), the community lies in the vicinity of the N.C. Highway 89 interchange with Interstate 77.  Prominent landmarks include Oak Grove Baptist Church.

Architectural significance
Haystack Farm, an example of Italianate architecture from the late 19th century on the National Register of Historic Places, is located here.

Other places called Oak Grove in Surry County
Oak Grove (36.490, -80.575) is also the name of a small community on North Carolina Highway 89 (Westfield Road) near Bannertown.  This Oak Grove is named for the Oak Grove United Methodist Church located here.

Notes

References

Unincorporated communities in Surry County, North Carolina
Unincorporated communities in North Carolina